Bohunice is a municipal district of the city of Brno, the second largest city in the Czech Republic.

It is located in the southwest part of the city. It is first mentioned in 1237. It began growing rapidly at the beginning of the 18th century. In 1919, Bohunice officially became part of Brno, which meant further growth. Street names first appeared in 1925. In 1921, Bohunice had 202 houses and 1463 inhabitants. Today's statistics show that Bohunice currently have approximately 540 houses with 17 300 inhabitants.

Until 1975, Bohunice was just a small district at one end of the city of Brno, connected with the city center by a bus. In the 1980s many housing developments were built.

Today, there is several tram lines, bus lines and trolleybus lines, which serve the transport to and from the city center. In the eastern direction it neighbors with the major Brno graveyard - The Central Cemetery - and the western part neighbors with the district Starý Lískovec.

Today Bohunice is probably best known for its hospital - it is the largest hospital in Moravia and one of the biggest hospitals in the Czech Republic. Recently, the hospital area was expanded greatly and the faculty of science and engineering of Masaryk University was relocated here - now known as the Univerzitní kampus. The entire complex was then expanded even further by building a shopping gallery and TESCO nearby and its name is Campus.

External links
 Official district's webpage

Brno
Neighbourhoods in the Czech Republic